William Gunnell House, also known as Gunnell's Run, is a historic home located in Great Falls, Fairfax County, Virginia. It consists of a frame dwelling built in two stages and dated to about 1750, together with its compatible and unobtrusive 20th-century additions. The earliest section is a -story frame Colonial-era dwelling with irregular bays and three entrances. It was carefully restored and rehabilitated in the preservation manner of the Colonial Revival style after 1933. Also on the property are a contributing log house (c. 1770) outbuilding and two early wells.

It was listed on the National Register of Historic Places in 2003.

References

Houses on the National Register of Historic Places in Virginia
Colonial architecture in Virginia
Colonial Revival architecture in Virginia
Houses completed in 1750
Houses in Fairfax County, Virginia
National Register of Historic Places in Fairfax County, Virginia